The 1948 Connecticut gubernatorial election was held on November 2, 1948. Democratic nominee Chester Bowles narrowly defeated incumbent Republican James C. Shannon with 49.31% of the vote.

General election

Candidates
Major party candidates
Chester Bowles, Democratic
James C. Shannon, Republican

Other candidates
Jasper McLevy, Socialist
Joseph Mackay, Socialist Labor
Morris Chertov, Socialist Workers

Results

References

1948
Connecticut
Gubernatorial